Hur Moghan-e Olya (also Romanized as Hūr Moghān-e ‘Olyā and Hoor Moghan Olya; also known as Ḩūrī Moqān, Ḩūr Moghān-e Bālā, Ḩūr Moqān-e Bālā, and Verkhnyaya Gurman) is a village in Peyghan Chayi Rural District, in the Central District of Kaleybar County, East Azerbaijan Province, Iran. At the 2006 census, its population was 37, in 13 families.

References 

Populated places in Kaleybar County